"Algo Más" (Something More) is a 1973 song by Spanish singer Camilo Sesto. It reached No. 1 on the Spanish charts for 10 weeks from 26 November 1973 to 28 January 1974. The song was written by the singer and arranged by Juan Carlos Calderón. The B-side, "Sin Remedio", was also written by Sesto and arranged by Johnny Arthey. The song took 5th place in the 1973 OTI Festival de la Canción.

References

1973 singles
Number-one singles in Spain
Camilo Sesto songs
1973 songs
Songs written by Juan Carlos Calderón